Tania Raymonde Helen Katz, is an American actress and artist. Her career first caught traction when she played the recurring character of Cynthia Sanders on the Fox sitcom Malcolm in the Middle between 2000 and 2002, followed by the role of Alex Rousseau in the ABC series Lost from 2006 to 2010. She has since played Carla Rinaldi on MTV's Death Valley (2011), starred in the horror film Texas Chainsaw 3D (2013), and portrayed Jodi Arias, the title role in the TV movie Jodi Arias: Dirty Little Secret (2013). In April 2015, she joined the cast of the TNT series The Last Ship. Since 2016 she has starred in the Amazon Prime Video series Goliath.

Early life
Tania Raymonde Helen Katz was born in Los Angeles, California, to parents Anne-Marie and Jon Katz. Her father is a Jewish American of Polish-Jewish descent, and her mother is French, a Catholic from Corsica.

Career
Raymonde's first television role was as Alice/Young Syd in the "Syd in Wonderland" episode of the TV series Providence. She subsequently appeared on other TV series, including The Brothers Garcia, The Nightmare Room, That's So Raven, The Guardian, Lost, Medium, Malcolm in the Middle, and NCIS.

She starred in the film Children on Their Birthdays (2002), her first feature film role. In 2003 she played Lauren O'Keefe in the sitcom The O'Keefes.

She is most known for her work on the ABC drama Lost, where she played Alex Rousseau, the adopted daughter of Benjamin Linus, played by Michael Emerson.

She also appeared in the films The Garage (2006), The Other Side of the Tracks (2008), Japan (2008), Chasing 3000 (2008), and Elsewhere (2009). She recurred opposite the late Dennis Hopper on the Starz series Crash. Raymonde also had a recurring role as Frankie Rafferty, Danny Pino's love interest, on season 6 of Cold Case.

At age 17, she wrote, edited and directed the short film Cell Division, which competed in film festivals around the country.

She appears in the music video for Maroon 5's "Won't Go Home Without You".

In 2013, Raymonde was cast in Chicago P.D., a spin-off of the NBC series Chicago Fire. She, along with co-star Scott Eastwood, left the show for creative reasons. Raymonde also portrayed the convicted murderer Jodi Arias in the Lifetime original movie Jodi Arias: Dirty Little Secret (2013).

From 2016 to 2021 she starred on the Golden Globe-winning Amazon series Goliath, alongside Billy Bob Thornton.

Filmography

Film

Television

Music videos

Director

References

External links

 
 

Living people
20th-century American Jews
20th-century American women
21st-century American actresses
21st-century American Jews
Actresses from Los Angeles
American child actresses
American film actresses
American television actresses
American people of Corsican descent
American people of French descent
American people of Polish-Jewish descent
Lycée Français de Los Angeles alumni
Year of birth missing (living people)